Racing for Life is a 1924 American silent action film directed by Henry MacRae and starring Eva Novak, William Fairbanks and Philo McCullough.

Cast
 Eva Novak as Grace Danton 
 William Fairbanks as Jack Grant 
 Philo McCullough as Carl Grant 
 Wilfred Lucas as Hudford 
 Ralph De Palma as The Champion 
 Lydia Knott as Mrs. Grant 
 Frankie Darro as Jimmy Danton 
 Edwin B. Tilton as David Danton 
 Frank Whitson as Hudford's partner 
 Harley Moore as Murray 
 Harry La Verne as Diggett 
 George Atkinson as Jackson Heath 
 Paul J. Derkum as Race Starter 
 Edgar Kennedy as Tom Grady

References

Bibliography
 Munden, Kenneth White. The American Film Institute Catalog of Motion Pictures Produced in the United States, Part 1. University of California Press, 1997.

External links
 

1924 films
1920s action films
American silent feature films
American auto racing films
American action films
American black-and-white films
Columbia Pictures films
Films directed by Henry MacRae
1920s English-language films
1920s American films